DWAQ-DTV (channel 43) is a television station in Metro Manila, Philippines, serving as the flagship of the religious channel SMNI. Owned and operated by Swara Sug Media Corporation, the station maintains studios at the ACQ Tower, Sta. Rita Street corner Epifanio de los Santos Avenue, Brgy. Guadalupe Nuevo,  Makati, and its hybrid digital transmitting facility is located at KJC Compound, Barangay Sauyo, Novaliches, Quezon City.

History

As ETV 39
During the late 1990s, the station began its operations on a test broadcast phase as "Net 39" under the Eagle Broadcasting Corporation, the predecessor of Net 25.

In 2000, it was acquired by Masawa Broadcasting Corporation and became ETV 39. The network attempted to become the first free-to-air gambling channel on UHF with the nightly Bingo Pilipino draws. It also aired music videos and infomercials for the Sydney Olympics 2000. However, it signed off in 2001 as former President Joseph Estrada banned its draws in response to public clamor.

As ACQ-KBN Sonshine TV / SMNI TV 39
On January 8, 2006, after the series of test broadcasts (that started from November 2005 to the first few days of January 2006), DWAQ-TV ACQ-KBN Sonshine TV 39 was launched at the first Global Thanksgiving and Worship presentation at the PhilSports Arena.

In July 2006, ACQ-KBN Sonshine TV to form as Sonshine Media Network International was launched as News and Public Affairs block which became a tie-up of ACQ-KBN Sonshine TV-39.

In August 2010, ACQ-KBN Sonshine TV (merger of ACQ-KBN and Sonshine Media Network International) was renamed as simply SMNI.

On February 19, 2023, SMNI DTT Channel 43 officially signed on during the first Global Thanksgiving and Worship presentation at the Ynares Center in Antipolo, Rizal. the network covered in Metro Manila and nearby provinces. Channel 43 will be used as the main channel of SMNI on DTT, while retaining the use of Channel 39 as a secondary channel after transitioning from analog to digital signal. The frequency was formerly used by AMCARA Broadcasting Network under blocktime agreement with ABS-CBN Corporation to air its digital channels on ABS-CBN TV Plus. Its analog signal, on the other hand, had permanently signed-off sometime in 2022.

Programming

Digital television

Digital channels

DWAQ-DTV's digital signal operates on UHF channel 39 (623.143 MHz) and UHF Channel 43 (647.143 MHz) broadcasts on the following subchannels:

In addition, Sonshine Media Network International also operates its channel on UHF Channel 44 (653.143 MHz)

In May 24, 2016, SMNI conduct a digital test broadcast with the ISDB-T standard via its UHF channel 40 (629.143 MHz) frequency.

NTC released implementing rules and regulations on the re-allocation of the UHF Channels 14–20 (470–512 Megahertz (MHz) band) for digital terrestrial television broadcasting (DTTB) service. All operating and duly authorized Mega Manila VHF (very high frequency) television networks are entitled to a channel assignment from Channels 14 to 20.

On January 26, 2022, the National Telecommunications Commission assigned the network's television frequency on began to transmit its digital test broadcast on channel 43 as its permanent frequency assigned by NTC. which was formerly used by Mareco Broadcasting Network as a TV carry-over station of 105.1 Crossover from 1994 to 2000 and AMCARA Broadcasting Network for ABS-CBN's DTT broadcast from 2013 to 2020.  On January 1, 2023, SMNI began to transmit its digital test broadcast on UHF Channel 43 (647.143 MHz) as its permanent frequency assigned by NTC.

Areas of coverage

Primary areas 
 Metro Manila 
 Cavite
 Laguna
 Rizal
 Bulacan

Secondary areas 
 Portion of Bataan
 Portion of Batangas
 Portion of Nueva Ecija
 Portion of Pampanga
 Portion of Zambales

See also
SMNI TV 43 Davao
DZAR
Sonshine Media Network International

References

Website 
www.kingdomofjesuschrist.org 
www.acqkbn.tv 
www.acqkbn.com 
www.sonshinemedia.com 
www.sonshinetv.com  
www.sonshineradio.com

Television stations in Metro Manila
Sonshine Media Network International
Television channels and stations established in 1998
Digital television stations in the Philippines